Jason James Lamar (born November 10, 1978) is a former American football linebacker who played one season with the Houston Texans of the National Football League. He played college football at the University of Toledo and attended Ypsilanti High School in Ypsilanti, Michigan. He was also a member of the Hamilton Tiger-Cats, Montreal Alouettes, and Edmonton Eskimos of the Canadian Football League.

Professional career

Hamilton Tiger-Cats
After spending the 2000 season with the San Francisco 49ers, Lamar signed with the Hamilton Tiger-Cats in May 2001. He was a CFL East Division All-Star in 2001.

Houston Texans
Lamar was signed by the Houston Texans on January 22, 2002. He was released by the Texans on August 31, 2003.

Edmonton Eskimos
Lamar was signed by the Edmonton Eskimos in September 2003. The Eskimos won the 91st Grey Cup on November 16, 2003 against the Montreal Alouettes.

Hamilton Tiger-Cats
Lamar was traded to the Hamilton Tiger-Cats on April 20, 2004. He was released after arguing on the sidelines with head coach Greg Marshall.

Montreal Alouettes

Edmonton Eskimos
Lamar signed with the Edmonton Eskimos on May 10, 2005.

References

External links
Just Sports Stats

Living people
1978 births
Players of American football from Detroit
American football linebackers
Canadian football linebackers
Toledo Rockets football players
Hamilton Tiger-Cats players
Houston Texans players
Montreal Alouettes players
Sportspeople from Ypsilanti, Michigan